Anthony Gerry Cassolato (born May 7, 1956) is a Canadian former professional ice hockey right winger.  He began his professional career in 1976 in the World Hockey Association, first with the San Diego Mariners and then the Birmingham Bulls.  After the WHA folded, he was signed as a free agent by the Washington Capitals, where he spent parts of three seasons.

Cassolato was born in Guelph, Ontario.

External links

1956 births
Birmingham Bulls players
Canadian sportspeople of Italian descent
Canadian ice hockey right wingers
Charlotte Checkers (SHL) players
Hershey Bears players
Ice hockey people from Ontario
Living people
Peterborough Petes (ice hockey) players
San Diego Mariners players
Sportspeople from Guelph
Undrafted National Hockey League players
Washington Capitals players